Parastremma is a genus of characins endemic to western Colombia.  There are currently three species in this genus.

Species
 Parastremma album Dahl, 1960
 Parastremma pulchrum Dahl, 1960
 Parastremma sadina C. H. Eigenmann, 1912

References
 

Characidae
Taxa named by Carl H. Eigenmann
Endemic fauna of Colombia
Freshwater fish of Colombia